Major General Thomas Rawlings Mould  (31 May 1805–13 June 1886) was an English military engineer of the Corps of Royal Engineers and Colonel of the Auckland Regiment of New Zealand Militia.

Mould was commissioned as a second lieutenant in the Royal Engineers in 1826. He served on the Ordnance Survey of Ireland from November 1827 to 17 August 1835, in the West Indies from 7 May 1836 to 30 September 1839, and designed covered slips at Chatham Dockyard in the 1840s. He went to New Zealand in 1855. He designed the Upper Hutt blockhouse, built in 1860 to protect European settlers during the Wellington Wars, and planned the same type of structure at Blockhouse Bay in Auckland. He also did work in connection with Albert Barracks in Auckland.

Publications

References

1805 births
1886 deaths
Royal Engineers officers
British military personnel of the New Zealand Wars
New Zealand engineers
19th-century New Zealand engineers
19th-century New Zealand military personnel
Companions of the Order of the Bath